Steven Rode (born 6 April 1980) is a former Australian rules footballer who played with Hawthorn in the Australian Football League (AFL) in 2000.

References

External links

Living people
1980 births
Australian rules footballers from Victoria (Australia)
Hawthorn Football Club players